Ruth Eweler (March 19, 1913 – October 1, 1947) was a German actress born in Plettenberg. She appeared in a number of films during the 1930s and 1940s, notably as a female lead in the 1937 film The Daughter of the Samurai, which was a German-Japanese co-production.

Selected filmography
 I for You, You for Me (1934)
 The Old and the Young King (1935)
 Cause for Divorce (1937)
 The Daughter of the Samurai (1937)
 Der Scheidungsgrund (1937)
 Men, Animals and Sensations (1938)
 We Danced Around the World (1939)
 Between Hamburg and Haiti (1940)
 Einmal der liebe Herrgott sein (1942)
 Elephant Fury (1953)

References

Bibliography
 High, Peter B. The Imperial screen: Japanese film culture in the Fifteen years' war, 1931-1945. University of Wisconsin Press, 2003.
 Hull, David Stewart. Film in the Third Reich: a study of the German cinema, 1933-1945. University of California Press, 1969.

External links

1913 births
1947 deaths
People from Plettenberg
People from the Province of Westphalia
German film actresses
20th-century German actresses